Kurilpa was a Legislative Assembly electorate in the state of Queensland from 1912 to 1986. It was named for the Kurilpa Peninsula on the Brisbane River. Until 1960, it was based in the inner southern Brisbane suburbs of West End and the western parts of South Brisbane, but after that, also included Dutton Park, Fairfield, Highgate Hill and parts of Yeronga and Annerley.

The seat was created at the 1910 distribution out of part of the two-member South Brisbane seat, and was abolished at the distribution ahead of the 1986 election.  The seat's last member, Anne Warner, transferred to South Brisbane, which absorbed most of Kurilpa's territory.

Members for Kurilpa

Election results

See also
 Electoral districts of Queensland
 Members of the Queensland Legislative Assembly by year
 :Category:Members of the Queensland Legislative Assembly by name

References

Former electoral districts of Queensland
Constituencies established in 1912
1912 establishments in Australia
Constituencies disestablished in 1986
1986 disestablishments in Australia